The Tribune is an American daily newspaper published Mondays through Saturdays in Seymour, Indiana. It is owned by AIM Media Indiana.

It covers the city of Seymour and all of Jackson County, Indiana.

History
Founded as the Seymour Daily Republican in 1885, the newspaper adopted the name Seymour Daily Tribune in 1920, shortening it to The Tribune on September 10, 1994.

More recently, the newspaper was owned by Freedom Communications, based in Orange County, California, at one point the 12th largest media conglomerate in the United States. Freedom declared bankruptcy in 2009 and, over the next three years, sold all of its television stations and its newspapers east of the Rocky Mountains, including The Tribune.

The Tribune buyer was Home News Enterprises, a family business based in Columbus, Indiana, in Bartholomew County, which adjoins Jackson County to the north. Freedom Communications CEO Mitch Stern called the sale "a natural evolution in a trusted relationship", noting that Home News had been printing The Tribune under contract at its Columbus presses since 2008.

References

External links 
 
 

Jackson County, Indiana
Newspapers published in Indiana
Publications established in 1885
1885 establishments in Indiana